Imi N'Oulaoune is a commune in the Ouarzazate Province of the Souss-Massa-Drâa administrative region of Morocco. At the time of the 2004 census, the commune had a total population of 19968 people living in 2654 households.

References

Populated places in Ouarzazate Province
Rural communes of Drâa-Tafilalet